The following were the events of Gymnastics for the year 2016 throughout the world.

2016 Summer Olympics (FIG)

 April 16 – 24: Aquece Rio Final Gymnastics Qualifier in  Rio de Janeiro (Olympic Test Event)
  won the gold medal tally.  won the overall medal tally.
 August 6 – 21: 2016 Summer Olympics in  Rio de Janeiro at the Arena Olímpica do Rio
 August 6 – 16: Artistic gymnastics
 Men
 Men's Team All-Around:  ;  ;  
 Men's Individual All-Around:   Kōhei Uchimura;   Oleg Vernyayev;   Max Whitlock
 Men's Floor:   Max Whitlock;   Diego Hypólito;   Arthur Mariano
 Men's Pommel Horse:   Max Whitlock;   Louis Smith;   Alexander Naddour
 Men's Rings:   Eleftherios Petrounias;   Arthur Zanetti;   Denis Ablyazin
 Men's Vault:   Ri Se-gwang;   Denis Ablyazin;   Kenzō Shirai
 Men's Parallel Bars:   Oleg Vernyayev;   Danell Leyva;   David Belyavskiy
 Men's Horizontal Bar:   Fabian Hambüchen;   Danell Leyva;   Nile Wilson
 Women
 Women's Team All-Around:  ;  ;  
 Women's Individual All-Around:   Simone Biles;   Aly Raisman;   Aliya Mustafina
 Women's Balance Beam:   Sanne Wevers;   Laurie Hernandez;   Simone Biles
 Women's Floor:   Simone Biles;   Aly Raisman;   Amy Tinkler
 Women's Uneven Bars:   Aliya Mustafina;   Madison Kocian;   Sophie Scheder
 Women's Vault:   Simone Biles;   Maria Paseka;   Giulia Steingruber
 August 12 & 13: Trampolining
 Men:   Uladzislau Hancharou;   Dong Dong;   Gao Lei
 Women:   Rosie MacLennan;   Bryony Page;   Li Dan
 August 19 – 21: Rhythmic gymnastics
 Individual All-Around:   Margarita Mamun;   Yana Kudryavtseva;   Ganna Rizatdinova
 Group All-Around:  ;  ;

Artistic gymnastics

 February 19 – 21: 2016 FIG World Artistic Gymnastics Challenge Cup AGF Trophy (#1) in  Baku
  won both the gold and overall medal tallies.
 March 5: AT&T American Cup World Cup 2016 C II (#2) in  Newark, New Jersey
 Men's winner:  Ryōhei Katō
 Women's winner:  Gabby Douglas
 March 12: World Cup 2016 C II (#3) in  Glasgow
 Men's winner:  Max Whitlock
 Women's winner:  MyKayla Skinner
 March 19 & 20: EnBW DTB-POKAL World Cup 2016 C II (#4) in  Stuttgart
 World Cup:  won both the gold and overall medal tallies.
 Overall Men's Team Challenge winners: 
Ukraine won the overall medal tally.
 Overall Women's Team Challenge winners: 
 Individual Women's Apparatus Team Challenge:  won the gold medal tally.  won the overall medal tally.
 March 23 – 26: 2016 African Artistic Gymnastics Championships for Men and Women in  Algiers
  won both the gold and overall medal tallies.
 March 24 – 26: 9th FIG ART Gymnastics World Challenge Cup (#5) in  Doha
  won the gold medal tally.  and  won 4 overall medals each.
 March 31 – April 4: 40th "TURNIER DER MEISTER" FIG World Challenge Cup (#6) in  Cottbus
  won the gold medal tally. Ukraine and  won 5 overall medals each.
 April 8 – 10: 12th Ljubljana FIG World Challenge Cup (#7) in 
  won both the gold and overall medal tallies.
 April 28 – May 1: FIG World Challenge Cup #8 in  Osijek
  won the gold medal tally.  won the overall medal tally.
 May 13 – 15: FIG World Challenge Cup #9 in  Varna
  won both the gold and overall medal tallies.
 May 20 – 22: FIG World Challenge Cup #10 in  São Paulo
  won both the gold and overall medal tallies.
 May 25 – 29: 2016 European Men's Artistic Gymnastics Championships in  Bern
  won both the gold and overall medal tallies.
 June 1 – 5: 2016 European Women's Artistic Gymnastics Championships in  Bern
 Seniors:  and  won 2 gold medals each. Russia won the overall medal tally. 
 Juniors:  won both the gold and overall medal tallies.
 June 23 – 26: FIG World Challenge Cup Artistic Gymnastics (#11) in  Anadia, Portugal
  and  won 2 gold medals each. China won the overall medal tally.
 July 1 – 3: FIG World Challenge Cup #12 in  Mersin
  won both the gold and overall medal tallies.
 October 7 – 9: FIG World Challenge Cup #13 (final) in  Szombathely
  won both the gold and overall medal tallies.
 November 17 – 20: 41st Turnier der Meister FIG Individual Apparatus World Cup 2016 in  Cottbus
  won both the gold and overall medal tallies.

Rhythmic gymnastics

 February 26 – 28: World Cup 2016 Cat. B #1 in  Espoo
 All-Around:  Aleksandra Soldatova
 Hoop:  Ganna Rizatdinova
 Ball:  Son Yeon-jae
 Clubs:  Aleksandra Soldatova
 Ribbon:  Ganna Rizatdinova
 Group All-Around: 
 Five-Ribbon Group: 
 Three Clubs and Two Hoops Group: 
 March 17 – 20: World Cup 2016 Cat. B #2 in  Lisbon
 All-Around:  Aleksandra Soldatova
 Hoop:  Aleksandra Soldatova
 Ball:  Aleksandra Soldatova
 Clubs:  Ganna Rizatdinova
 Ribbon:  Ganna Rizatdinova
 Group All-Around: 
 Five-Ribbon Group: 
 Three Clubs and Two Hoops Group: 
 April 1 – 3: World Cup 2016 Cat. B #3 in  Pesaro
 All-Around:  Yana Kudryavtseva
 Hoop:  Margarita Mamun
 Ball:  Ganna Rizatdinova
 Clubs:  Margarita Mamun
 Ribbon:  Ganna Rizatdinova
 Five-Ribbon Group: 
 Six Clubs and Two Hoops Group: 
 April 28 – May 1: 2016 Asian Junior Rhythmic Gymnastics Championships in  Astana
 Team: 
 Group: 
 All-Around:  Sumire Kita
 Hoop:  Alina Adilkhanova
 Ball:  Alina Adilkhanova
 Clubs:  Sumire Kita
 Ribbon:  Sumire Kita
 May 13 – 15: World Cup 2016 Cat. B #4 in  Tashkent
 All-Around:  Yana Kudryavtseva
 Hoop:  Yana Kudryavtseva
 Ball:  Yana Kudryavtseva
 Clubs:  Yana Kudryavtseva
 Ribbon:  Yana Kudryavtseva
 Group All-Around: 
 Five-Ribbon Group: 
 Six Clubs and Two Hoops Group: 
 May 20 – 22: BSB Bank World Cup 2016 Cat. B (#5) in  Minsk
 All-Around:  Margarita Mamun
 Hoop:  Margarita Mamun
 Ball:  Margarita Mamun
 Clubs:  Margarita Mamun
 Ribbon:  Margarita Mamun
 Group All-Around: 
 Five-Ribbon Group: 
 Six Clubs and Two Hoops Group: 
 May 27 – 29: World Cup 2016 Cat. B #6 in  Sofia
 All-Around:  Yana Kudryavtseva
 Hoop:  Ganna Rizatdinova
 Ball:  Yana Kudryavtseva
 Clubs:  Son Yeon-jae
 Ribbon:  Yana Kudryavtseva
 Group All-Around: 
 Five-Ribbon Group: 
 Three Clubs and Two Hoops: 
 June 3 – 5: World Cup 2016 Cat. B #7 in  Guadalajara, Castile-La Mancha
 All-Around:  Margarita Mamun
 Hoop:  Margarita Mamun
 Ball:  Aleksandra Soldatova
 Clubs:  Margarita Mamun
 Ribbon:  Margarita Mamun
 Group All-Around: 
 Five-Ribbon Group: 
 Six Clubs and Two Hoops: 
 June 17 – 19: 2016 Rhythmic Gymnastics European Championships in  Holon
 All-Around:  Yana Kudryavtseva
 Hoop:  Ganna Rizatdinova
 Ball:  Margarita Mamun
 Clubs:  Margarita Mamun
 Ribbon:  Margarita Mamun
 Group All-Around: 
 Five-Ribbon Group: 
 Three Clubs and Two Hoops: 
 July 1 – 3: Berlin Master 2016. Cat. B (#8) in 
 All-Around:  Dina Averina
 Hoop:  Ganna Rizatdinova and  Melitina Staniouta (tie)
 Ball:  Dina Averina
 Clubs:  Ganna Rizatdinova
 Ribbon:  Dina Averina
 Group All-Around: 
 Five-Ribbon Group: 
 Three Clubs and Two Hoops: 
 July 8 – 10: World Cup 2016 Cat. B #9 in  Kazan
 All-Around:  Margarita Mamun
 Hoop:  Yana Kudryavtseva
 Ball:  Yana Kudryavtseva
 Clubs:  Margarita Mamun
 Ribbon:  Margarita Mamun
 Group All-Around: 
 Five-Ribbon Group: 
 Three Clubs and Two Hoops: 
 July 22 – 24: World Cup 2016 Cat. B #10 (final) in  Baku
 All-Around:  Margarita Mamun
 Hoop:  Yana Kudryavtseva
 Ball:  Margarita Mamun
 Clubs:  Margarita Mamun and  Yana Kudryavtseva (tie)
 Ribbon:  Margarita Mamun and  Yana Kudryavtseva (tie)
 Group All-Around: 
 Five-Ribbon Group: 
 Three Clubs and Two Hoops:

Trampolining/Tumbling

 March 5 & 6: AGF Trophy World Cup 2016 Cat. A #1 in  Baku
 Men's individual trampoline winner:  Dmitry Ushakov
 Women's individual trampoline winner:  Hanna Harchonak
 Men's synchronized trampoline winners:  (Nikita Fedorenko, Dmitry Ushakov)
 Women's synchronized trampoline winners:  (Hanna Harchonak, Tatsiana Piatrenia)
 March 31 – April 3: 2016 European Trampoline Championships in  Valladolid
  won both the gold and overall medal tallies.
 May 14 & 15: World Cup 2016 Cat. A #2 in  Shanghai
 Men's individual trampoline winner:  Dong Dong
 Women's individual trampoline winner:  Li Dan
 Men's synchronized trampoline winners:  (Bartlomiej Hes, Lukasz Tomaszewski)
 Women's synchronized trampoline winners:  (Dakota Earnest, Shaylee Dunavin)
 Men's individual tumbling winner:  ZHANG Luo
 Women's individual tumbling winner:  JIA Fangfang
 June 18 & 19: World Cup 2016 Cat. A #3 in  Brescia
 Men's individual trampoline winner:  Dong Dong
 Women's individual trampoline winner:  Li Dan
 Men's synchronized trampoline winners:  (Sergei Azarian, Mikhail Melnik)
 Women's synchronized trampoline winners:  (Hanna Harchonak, Tatsiana Piatrenia)
 June 24 & 25: World Cup 2016 Cat. A #4 in  Arosa
 Men's individual trampoline winner:  Dmitry Ushakov
 Women's individual trampoline winner:  Rosie MacLennan
 Men's synchronized trampoline winners:  (Masaki Ito, Ginga Munetomo)
 Women's synchronized trampoline winners:  (Susana Kochesok, Anna Kornetskaya)
 July 8 & 9: World Cup 2016 Cat. A #5 (final) in  Coimbra
 Men's individual trampoline winner:  Uladzislau Hancharou
 Women's individual trampoline winner:  Tatsiana Piatrenia
 Men's synchronized trampoline winners:  (Sergei Azarian, Mikhail Melnik)
 Women's synchronized trampoline winners:  (Hanna Harchonak, Tatsiana Piatrenia)
 Men's individual tumbling winner:  Rasmus Steffensen
 Women's individual tumbling winner:  Anna Korobeinikova

References

 
Gymnastics by year